Kevin Adom Lokko (born 3 November 1995) is an English footballer who plays as a defender for National League South club Farnborough. He began his career at Norwich City's academy, where he spent two years as an academy scholar and was part of the FA Youth Cup-winning team during the 2012–13 season. He was released in May 2014 and joined Colchester United four months later, although injury meant he did not make any first-team appearances during his one season with the Essex club. Lokko gained his first experience of regular first-team football when he signed for National League club Welling United ahead of the 2015–16 season.

He spent one year at Welling before joining another National League club in the form of Maidstone United in June 2016. After one season at Maidstone, Lokko signed for Stevenage in August 2017. He was immediately loaned to Dagenham & Redbridge before returning to Stevenage in February 2018, then joining Dover Athletic on loan later that month. Lokko joined Dover on a permanent basis in June 2018. Lokko became captain at Dover before joining Harrogate Town in 2020. He signed for Aldershot Town of the National League in July 2021, where he spent one season before joining National League South club Farnborough in July 2022.

Early life
Born in Poplar, London, England, Lokko grew up in Romford in Essex. His father is from Ghana and his mother is from Ukraine. Due to his mother's Ukrainian heritage, Lokko grew up speaking Russian. He attended Easton College in Norwich where he studied sports performance and business studies.

Club career

Early career
Lokko joined Norwich City's academy at the age of 15, signing a two-year deal as an academy scholar in the summer of 2012. He spent two years playing regularly for Norwich's under-18 team and was part of the FA Youth Cup-winning squad during the 2012–13 season. Lokko was released by the club upon the expiry of his scholarship contract in May 2014. Lokko went on trial at Colchester United in July 2014, playing in several under-21 matches, as well as in the first-team's final pre-season friendly ahead of the 2014–15 season. The trial period proved successful and Lokko signed a one-year deal on 19 August 2014, with the club stating he would join up with the under-21 squad to further his development. Although he began to train with the first-team, and was an unused substitute in two first-team matches in the opening months of the season, Lokko sustained a hip injury that kept him out of first-team action for five months and he did not make any appearances during the season. He was released when his contract expired in May 2015.

Welling United
Ahead of the 2015–16 season, on 20 July 2015, Lokko signed a one-year contract with National League club Welling United. The move came about after Lokko had played in the club's opening two pre-season fixtures and was offered a contract following the trial. He made his debut for Welling in the club's first game of the season on 8 August 2015, playing the whole match in a 1–0 victory against Guiseley at Park View Road. Lokko scored his first competitive goal in Welling's 2–1 home win over Woking on 28 March 2016, his first-half header proving decisive in helping Welling end their 23-game winless run. He was a mainstay in the centre of defence throughout the season, making 42 appearances in all competitions, scoring once, in what was Lokko's breakthrough season of regular first-team football. Lokko left the club when his contract expired in May 2016.

Maidstone United
Lokko subsequently signed for National League club Maidstone United on a free transfer on 3 June 2016. He rejected several offers from other National League teams prior to signing for Maidstone, stating he had "done his research" and was impressed by Maidstone's three promotions in four years under manager Jay Saunders. Lokko made his Maidstone debut in a 1–1 home draw with York City on the opening day of the 2016–17 season. He scored his first goal for the club at the end of that month, an injury-time winning goal in a 1–0 away victory at Boreham Wood on 29 August 2016. Lokko scored twice in Maidstone's 4–2 win against Chester at the Gallagher Stadium on 18 February 2017, both of Lokko's goals coming in the first half of the match. He played regularly during his one season at Maidstone, scoring four times in 46 appearances in all competitions.

Stevenage
Four days before the start of the 2017–18 season, on 2 August 2017, Lokko signed for League Two club Stevenage for an undisclosed fee and on a two-year contract. The transfer occurred when Stevenage triggered a buyout clause in Lokko's contract after several other clubs had also shown interest in the player. Two days after joining Stevenage, Lokko was loaned out to Dagenham & Redbridge of the National League on a season-long loan agreement, in order for him to continue to gain first-team experience. Lokko made his Dagenham debut in the club's 2–1 home victory against Barrow on 5 August 2017 and was awarded Man of the Match for his performance. He scored in consecutive games at the end of August in home fixtures against Ebbsfleet United and Bromley respectively. He was a regular in the centre of defence during his time at Dagenham, scoring two goals in 28 appearances in all competitions.

Lokko was recalled by Stevenage at the start of February 2018, with their chairman Phil Wallace revealing that several transfer deadline day deals gave the club the opportunity to recall Lokko and ensure he was "integrated in the squad on a daily basis ready for next season". He made his debut for the club as an 85th-minute substitute in the club's 3–1 away defeat at Forest Green Rovers on 13 February 2018. A week after making his Stevenage debut, Lokko was loaned out to National League club Dover Athletic for the remainder of the 2017–18 campaign; Stevenage retaining an option to recall Lokko after 28 days if necessary. He made his debut for Dover in a 3–1 away loss at AFC Fylde on 24 February 2018, coming on as a 77th-minute substitute in the match. Lokko went on to make 12 appearances during the loan agreement, scoring once, before returning to Stevenage at the end of the season where he was made available for transfer.

Dover Athletic
Lokko signed for Dover Athletic on a permanent basis on 27 June 2018, joining the club for an undisclosed fee. He made his second debut at Dover in the club's first match of the 2018–19 season, playing the full 90 minutes in a 1–0 defeat to Wrexham on 4 August 2018. Lokko scored his first goal of the campaign three days later, briefly giving Dover the lead from close-range in an eventual 2–2 draw with Bromley. Lokko was voted as the National League Player of the Month for January 2019, with Lokko scoring once and Dover's defence keeping three clean sheets during the month. He played 42 times during his first full season at Dover, scoring six goals from defence, as the club ended the season nine games unbeaten to finish in 14th place in the National League. Lokko was named as Dover's new captain on 27 June 2019. He made 29 appearances and scored four goals during Dover's 2019–20 season, which was curtailed in March 2020 due to the COVID-19 pandemic.

Harrogate Town
Lokko returned to the Football League when he signed for League Two club Harrogate Town on a two-year contract on 14 August 2020. Harrogate's assistant manager Paul Thirlwell stated the club had tracked his availability after he impressed them when Harrogate played Dover during the previous season. He scored on his Harrogate debut in the club's 2–2 draw with Grimsby Town in the EFL Trophy on 8 September 2020. He played a peripheral role during the 2020–21 season, making eight appearances and scoring two goals in all competitions. With a year remaining on his contract at Harrogate, Lokko was told he was free to look for another club at the end of the season.

Aldershot Town
He subsequently signed for National League club Aldershot Town on a two-year contract on 16 July 2021.

Farnborough
Following his release from Aldershot, Lokko agreed to join Farnborough in May 2022.

International career
Lokko was called up to the England C team, who represent England at non-League level, for their two fixtures in May 2017. He made his England C debut on 28 May 2017, playing the full match in a 2–1 win over Panjab FA at Damson Park. Two days later, he once again played the whole 90 minutes in a 1–1 draw with Jersey FA.

Style of play
Lokko has been deployed as a centre-back throughout his career. He is left-footed and plays as a left-sided central defender. Described by Harrogate Town assistant manager Paul Thirlwell as a ball-playing defender with "a great range of passing", Lokko has also been praised for his attacking threat from set-pieces.

Career statistics

References

External links

1995 births
Living people
English footballers
English sportspeople of Ghanaian descent
Association football defenders
Colchester United F.C. players
Welling United F.C. players
Maidstone United F.C. players
Stevenage F.C. players
Dagenham & Redbridge F.C. players
Dover Athletic F.C. players
Harrogate Town A.F.C. players
Aldershot Town F.C. players
Farnborough F.C. players
English Football League players
National League (English football) players
Footballers from Whitechapel